Vision (Aarkus) is a fictional character, a superhero appearing in American comic books published by Marvel Comics. Created by the writer Joe Simon and artist Jack Kirby, the character first appeared during the Golden Age of comic books in Marvel Mystery Comics #13 (Nov. 1940), published by Marvel predecessor Timely Comics.

Publication history 

The Vision debuted in a short comic story in Marvel Mystery Comics #13 (Nov. 1940), and continued as a regular feature in that superhero anthology through issue #48 (Oct. 1943). He also starred in an eight-page story in Kid Comics #3 (no month given; previous issue dated Summer 1943).

Five decades later, he appeared in a flashback story in the superhero-team series The Invaders vol. 2, #3 (July 1993), set during World War II. He returns with the other Invaders in the miniseries Invaders Now!, beginning with issue #1 (Nov. 2010). He appeared in several issues of the Marvel NOW! relaunch of X-Men: Legacy, before appearing in the All-New Invaders series in 2014.

Fictional character biography
The Golden Age Vision, also known as Aarkus, is an alien law enforcement officer from a dimension called Smokeworld. While Aarkus is looking for a suitable place to exile a prisoner, he is accidentally contacted by an Earth scientist named Markham Erickson. Leaving the prisoner on the planet Jupiter, Aarkus accepts Erickson's invitation to fight crime on Earth. Aarkus does so for several years, although during World War II he is briefly manipulated by the Axis powers into fighting the Allies. The superhero team the Invaders help Aarkus realize his mistake.

A simulacrum of the Vision was temporarily created by Rick Jones, along with those of the Blazing Skull, the Fin, and the Golden Age Angel and Patriot, to aid the superhero team the Avengers during the Kree-Skrull War.

A later story presents the character as inhabiting the sewers under New York, taking care of a Cosmic Cube that is feeding off the feelings of people affected by the death of Captain America. Following a period in which he traveled through time, he is seen with the newly resurrected Toro. He plays a supporting role in 2012's X-Men: Legacy, first opposing and later aiding main character Legion. During the story, he falls into a coma and is confined to the medical wing of the Jean Grey School for Higher Learning.

After awaking from his coma, Aarkus is approached by the Winter Soldier for help in getting the surviving members of the Invaders to the Kree home world to rescue Namor. The story presents events from World War II, portraying Aarkus as erasing the memories of the Invaders (with their consent) in order to hide the location of an ancient Kree weapon called the God's Whisper, that had granted Baron von Strucker the power to control gods. The Invaders then attack Kree in order to free Namor and recover the weapon. A later story presents Aarkus as working with the Eternals on using the God's Whisper to manipulate Galactus.

Powers and abilities
The Vision can generate illusory images of himself, fly, generate ice and extreme cold, and teleport wherever there is smoke.

Vision reprints
Some of the original stories of the original Vision have been reprinted in other publications.

 Golden Age Marvel Comics Vol. 4, Roy Thomas editor, (2009, hardcover) reprints Marvel Mystery Comics' #13-16, 1940-41
 Golden Age Marvel Comics Vol. 5, Roy Thomas editor, (2010, hardcover) reprints Marvel Mystery Comics' #17-20, 1941
 Golden Age Marvel Comics Vol. 6, Roy Thomas editor, (2011, hardcover) reprints Marvel Mystery Comics' #21-24, 1941
 Golden Age Marvel Comics Vol. 7, Roy Thomas editor, (2012, hardcover) reprints Marvel Mystery Comics' #25-28, 1941-42				
Marvel Visionaries: Jack Kirby Vol. 1 (2004, hardcover) reprints "The Vision" from Marvel Mystery Comics 13, Nov 1940 
Marvel Visionaries: Jack Kirby Vol. 2 (2006, hardcover) reprints "The Vision" from Marvel Mystery Comics 23, Sept 1941
 The comic Marvel Super-Heroes, March 1968, reprints the Vision story from Marvel Mystery Comics 25

In other media
Vision (Aarkus) was made a playable character in Marvel Contest of Champions.

References

External links
Vision at Nevins, Jess. A Guide to Golden Age Marvel Characters WebCitation archive of latter.
The Golden Age Vision at Don Markstein's Toonopedia
Theakston, Greg. Marvel Mystery Comics #13 at the Grand Comics Database

Comics characters introduced in 1940
Characters created by Jack Kirby
Characters created by Joe Simon
Fictional characters with ice or cold abilities
Fictional illusionists
Fictional World War II veterans
Golden Age superheroes
Marvel Comics aliens
Marvel Comics characters who can teleport
Marvel Comics extraterrestrial superheroes
Marvel Comics superheroes
Marvel Comics male superheroes
Timely Comics characters

fr:Vision (comics)